Events from the year 1788 in Denmark.

Incumbents
 Monarch – Christian VII
 Prime minister – Andreas Peter Bernstorff

Events
 September 24 – The Theater War begins, when Denmark-Norway launches an attack on Sweden at Bohuslän as a diversion to support Russia, an ally of Denmark-Norway, who had in turn been attacked by Sweden in Gustav III's Russian War.

Undated
 Eriksholm Manor is completed to designs by Caspar Frederik Harsdorff.

Births
 February 18 - Princess Juliane Sophie of Denmark, princess of Denmark (died 1850)
 September 28 - Gustav Friedrich Hetsch, architect (died 1864)
 December 29 – Christian Jürgensen Thomsen, archaeologist and arts administrator (died 1865)
 undated - Anna Salmberg, educator  (died 1868)

Deaths
 17 May – Dorothea Biehl, playwright, translator (born 1731)

References

 
1780s in Denmark
Denmark
Years of the 18th century in Denmark